Roller speed skating at the 2018 Summer Youth Olympics was held from 7 to 8 October. The competition took place at the Paseo de la Costa in Buenos Aires, Argentina. This marked the debut of the sport at the Youth Olympics.

Qualification

Each National Olympic Committee (NOC) was permitted a maximum of two competitors, one boy and one girl. As hosts, Argentina was granted one male and one female competitor, should they not qualify normally, and an additional two competitors, one boy and one girl, were to be decided by the tripartite committee. However, no competitors from Argentina ultimately participated in the event. The remaining places were decided at the 2018 Roller Speed Skating World Championship, with each participating continent guaranteed a spot at the games. No African competitors participated in the 2018 Inline Speed Skating World Championship and, therefore, no competitors representing an African nation participated in the event at the Youth Olympics.

To be eligible to participate at the Youth Olympics athletes must have been born between 1 January 2000 and 31 December 2003.

Boys

 Continental quota

Girls

 Continental quota

Medal summary

Medal table

Events

References

External links
Official Results Book – Roller Speed Skating

 
2018 Summer Youth Olympics events
Youth Summer Olympics
2018